Post open source, also called "post open-source software (POSS)", is a 2012/2013 noticed movement among software developers, in particular open-source software developers. The interpretation was that this was a reaction to the complex compliance requirements of the software license/permission culture, noticed by more code being posted into repositories without any license whatsoever, implying a disregard for the current license regimes, including copyleft as supporter of the current copyright system ("Copyright reform movement").

History
"POSS" was first used by James Governor, founder of analyst firm RedMonk, who said "younger devs today are about POSS – Post open-source software. fuck the license and governance, just commit to github." According to Luis Villa, when even "...the open license ecosystem assumes that sharing can't (or even shouldn't) happen without explicit permission in the form of licenses", developers vote their dissent through POSS.

Precursor 
In 2004 Daniel J. Bernstein pushed a similar idea with his License-free software, where he neither placed his software (qmail, djbdns, daemontools, and ucspi-tcp) into public domain nor released it with a software license. But, with end of 2007 he dedicated his software in the public domain with an explicit waiver statement.

See also
 License-free software
 Anti-copyright notice
 Copyright reform movement

References

Software distribution